Hu Guangzhen (26 August 1927 – 23 January 2023) was a Chinese electronic engineer, and an academician of the Chinese Academy of Engineering.

Biography
Hu was born in Songjiang County (now Shanghai), Jiangsu, on 26 August 1927, and graduated from Jiaotong University in 1948. In November 1949, he became a technician of Tianjin Factory of Civil Aviation Administration of the Central Military Commission, and worked until July 1952. In August 1952, he was transferred to the People's Liberation Army General Staff Department, where he was promoted to engineer in December 1956 and to chief engineer in December 1980.

On 23 January 2023, he died at the age of 95.

Honours and awards
 1996 State Science and Technology Progress Award (Special)
 1997 Member of the Chinese Academy of Engineering (CAE)
 2001 State Science and Technology Progress Award (Special)

References

1927 births
2023 deaths
Engineers from Shanghai
National Chiao Tung University (Shanghai) alumni
Members of the Chinese Academy of Engineering
20th-century Chinese engineers
21st-century Chinese engineers